Hindon is a small settlement in inland Otago, in the South Island of New Zealand. The Taieri Gorge Railway runs through Hindon on its way between Dunedin and Middlemarch.

Hindon was named by provincial superintendent John Hyde Harris, who owned land in the area, though the origin of the name is not known. The area was a centre of activity during the latter part of the Otago Gold Rush, with several mines working the gold-bearing quartz reefs at Hindon and nearby Barewood. The size of the township dwindled markedly after the end of the rush. Little remains of the mines, though some subsided shafts remain as hazards for local farmers.

Hindon has a population of around 70 people. At the height of the gold rush its population was around 1200.

References

Populated places in Otago